Heinrich Adolf Gottron (10 March 1890 – 23 June 1974) was a German dermatologist remembered for Gottron's papules and Gottron's syndrome.

External links 
 

1890 births
1974 deaths
German dermatologists
Knights Commander of the Order of Merit of the Federal Republic of Germany